The South Coast Trunk Road is a former designation of a  long route in southern England, sometimes called the Folkestone to Honiton trunk route. It is made up of several numbered roads (from west to east):

 the A35 from Honiton to Bere Regis
 the A31 from Bere Regis to Cadnam
 the M27 from Cadnam to Portsmouth
 the A27 from Portsmouth to Pevensey
 the A259 from Pevensey to Brenzett
 the A2070 from Brenzett to Ashford
 the M20 from Ashford to Folkestone

References

Roads in England
Transport in West Sussex
Transport in East Sussex
Transport in Hampshire
Transport in Devon
Transport in Dorset
Transport in Kent
Roads in Kent
Roads in West Sussex
Roads in East Sussex
Roads in Hampshire
Roads in Devon
Roads in Dorset